Diebesturm (German for "Thieves' Tower) may refer to:

 Diebesturm (Witzenhausen), a round tower in Witzenhausen, Germany
 Diebesturm (Bad Sooden-Allendorf), a round tower in Bad Sooden-Allendorf, Germany